The 2002 Idea Prokom Open was a combined men's and women's tennis tournament played on outdoor clay courts in Sopot in Poland that was part of the International Series of the 2002 ATP Tour and of Tier III of the 2002 WTA Tour. The tournament ran from 21 July through 28 July 2002.

Finals

Men's singles

 José Acasuso defeated  Franco Squillari 2–6, 6–1, 6–3
 It was Acasuso's only title of the year and the 1st of his career.

Women's singles

 Dinara Safina defeated  Henrieta Nagyová 6–3, 4–0 (Nagyová retired)
 It was Safina's only title of the year and the 1st of her career.

Men's doubles

 František Čermák /  Leoš Friedl defeated  Jeff Coetzee /  Nathan Healey 7–5, 7–5
 It was Čermák's 2nd title of the year and the 2nd of his career. It was Friedl's only title of the year and the 2nd of his career.

Women's doubles

 Svetlana Kuznetsova /  Arantxa Sánchez-Vicario defeated  Evgenia Kulikovskaya /  Ekaterina Sysoeva 6–2, 6–2
 It was Kuznetsova's 1st title of the year and the 1st of her career. It was Sánchez-Vicario's 3rd title of the year and the 98th of her career.

Idea Prokom Open
Idea Prokom Open
Orange Warsaw Open
Orange